Mark Wilcox is the former Arkansas Commissioner of State Lands. A Democrat, he was first elected in November 2002, taking office in January 2003, and was reelected in November 2006 to a second term.

He previously served as a county official in Faulkner County, having been elected justice of the peace in 1990 and tax collector in 1992.

External links
Arkansas Commissioner of State Lands
Campaign site

Living people
Arkansas Democrats
Year of birth missing (living people)